Sabine Huth (born 3 January 1967) is a former German curler.

Teams

References

External links

Living people
1967 births
German female curlers
Curlers at the 1992 Winter Olympics
Olympic curlers of Germany
European curling champions
Place of birth missing (living people)